Day of Conception (also known as Procreation Day) is a Russian Holiday made popular by the region of Ulyanovsk, birthplace of Vladimir Lenin.  The day itself takes place on September 12th, and couples who then have a child on June 12th are rewarded by the regional government.

History 

In his 2006 State of the Nation address, Russian President Vladimir Putin called the demographic crisis the most urgent problem facing Russia and announced efforts to boost Russia's birth rate, including cash incentives to families that have more than one child. 

In 2005 Gov. Sergey Ivanovich Morozov of Ulyanovsk, the region about 800 kilometres east of Moscow, added an element of fun to the national campaign by declaring September 12th the Day of Conception and giving couples time off from work to procreate and produce the next generation. The 2007 grand prize went to Irina and Andrei Kartuzov, who received a UAZ-Patriot, a sport utility vehicle made in Ulyanovsk. Other contestants won video cameras, TVs, refrigerators and washing machines.  The event is designed to reduce what some Russian elements view as increasing sexlessness among young people in Russia.

References

External links 
 Russians get day off to procreate, then win prizes by Denver Post
 National Procreation Day by Giosue' Santarelli nthWORD Magazine

Observances in Russia
Fertility
September observances
Autumn events in Russia